Cade is a census-designated place (CDP) in St. Martin Parish, Louisiana, United States. At the 2014 census estimates, Cade had a population of 1,188; in 2019, the American Community Survey estimated its population was 1,655.   With the 2020 U.S. Census the population was 1874. The community is served by a single ZIP code: 70519.

The community was founded and named after Captain Cade, who was the long time sheriff of New Iberia. It is now home to the Episcopal School of Acadiana, Bruce Foods, Spanish Trail Golf Course, and The Pines Ranch (Louisiana's first organic ranch). In contrast with many rural communities, Cade does not have a police station, or health center. The crime and unemployment rate are low in Cade compared to the U.S. average.

Geography 
The community of Cade, located in southwestern St. Martin Parish, is situated at Louisiana highways 182 and 92-1.

Demographics 

The 2019 American Community Survey estimated 1,655 people lived in the community. The racial and ethnic makeup of the census-designated place was 68.2% non-Hispanic white, 24.8% Black and African American, 1.0% Asian, and 6.0% multiracial. The median age was 38.2, and the median household income was $53,250; males had a median income of $53,639 versus $30,714 for females. An estimated 10.2% of the population lived at or below the poverty line.

References

Census-designated places in Louisiana
Census-designated places in St. Martin Parish, Louisiana
Census-designated places in Lafayette metropolitan area, Louisiana